Civic Committee of the Solidarity with Ukraine ( or KOSzU) – Polish organization founded in order to support pro-democratic changes in Ukraine. The group has been established at the beginning of Revolution of Dignity (Revolution of Euromaidan) in the beginning of 2014.

Mission 
The mission, as declared in Founding Declaration, is support for pro-democratic changes in Ukraine, but also providing support to people and organizations repressed for their political beliefs. Other aims Include:

 The Mobilization of public opinion in Poland and abroad for its solidarity with Ukraine.
 Money collection for the Fund of Solidarity with Ukraine, but mostly support and promotion of various already existing non-governmental initiatives that were active and experienced in this thematic area.
 The support of initiatives for the material and substantial support for Ukrainian citizens in need and organizations and initiatives involved in activities for pro-democratic changes in Ukraine.
 Help and support for the repressed.
 The activation of cooperation between different regions in Poland and Ukraine, and eventually cooperation of local administration on all levels.
 Informing media and public opinion about situation in Ukraine.

Foundation 
The Committee (KOSzU) was founded on 30 January 2014. This was then announced in a press conference held on 4 February 2014 in Warsaw.

The name of the committee, its structure and activities was a reference to the tradition of Solidarity Citizens' Committees of late 1980s which declared that "people of various political stands and diverse nationalities worked together for the creation of independent and self-governing Republic" (Rzeczpospolita). According to its founding declaration, the Committee - by its activity - wants to ensure the citizens of Ukraine the same possibility of building an independent state and - acting by the rule of subsidiarity - support them in their actions towards this goal.

Simultaneously, from its foundation, KOSzU has declared and realized policy of political independence. And also, that it will not be attempting to gain legal personality or own assets.

Members

Founding members

Supporting organizations 

 Free Word Association (SWS)
 Union of Ukrainians in Poland (ZUwP)
 Education for Democracy Foundation
 Helsinki Committee Foundation (Poland)

Structure and activity 
The activities of the Committee are based on social and voluntary work of own members organized in working sections:

 information section;
 section of direct support on the territory of Ukraine - the section can run "public collections in order to support wounded, repressed and their families in Kyiv and other cities";
 local government section - "mediates and initiates organization of support for Ukrainian protest movements by the local authorities in Poland, including those who have signed sister cities agreements with cities or regions in Ukraine"
 section of direct actions in Poland
 legal section - providing "support in publicizing cases of abuse of power towards Ukrainian citizens, conducting publicity in Poland of cases of people repressed and beaten by Ukrainian authorities, and prepares intervention letters to the Ukrainian authorities, including regions of Ukraine, on the fate of protesters on whom unlawful investigations have been initiated " (description from 02.2014)

References

External links 
 

2014 in Poland
Euromaidan